Riazat Ali Shah (born 20 February 1998) is a Pakistani-born Ugandan cricketer who plays for the Uganda national cricket team. He is an all-rounder who bats right-handed and bowls right-arm medium pace.

Early life
Shah was born on 20 February 1998 in Gilgit, Pakistan, the son of Meger Nigar and Hiyadat Shah. He is an Isma'ili. He played cricket at under-19 level for Gilgit-Baltistan and Islamabad.

International career
Shah moved to Uganda at the age of 16, where he began playing for Aziz Damani Sports Club in Kampala.

In April 2018, he was named in Uganda's squad for the 2018 ICC World Cricket League Division Four tournament in Malaysia. He played in Uganda's opening match of the tournament, against Malaysia. In July 2018, he was part of Uganda's squad in the Eastern sub region group for the 2018–19 ICC World Twenty20 Africa Qualifier tournament. He was named the player of the tournament for the Eastern group.

In September 2018, he was named in Uganda's squad for the 2018 Africa T20 Cup. He made his Twenty20 debut for Uganda in the 2018 Africa T20 Cup on 14 September 2018. The following month, he was named in Uganda's squad for the 2018 ICC World Cricket League Division Three tournament in Oman. He was the joint-leading wicket-taker for Uganda in the tournament, with six dismissals in five matches.

In May 2019, he was named in Uganda's squad for the Regional Finals of the 2018–19 ICC T20 World Cup Africa Qualifier tournament in Uganda. He made his Twenty20 International (T20I) debut for Uganda against Botswana on 20 May 2019. He finished as the leading run-scorer in the Regional Finals, with 140 runs in four matches.

In July 2019, he was one of twenty-five players named in the Ugandan training squad, ahead of the Cricket World Cup Challenge League fixtures in Oman. In November 2019, he was named in Uganda's squad for the Cricket World Cup Challenge League B tournament in Oman. He made his List A debut, for Uganda against Jersey, on 2 December 2019. In November 2021, he was named in Uganda's squad for the Regional Final of the 2021 ICC Men's T20 World Cup Africa Qualifier tournament in Rwanda. In May 2022, he was named in Uganda's side for the 2022 Uganda Cricket World Cup Challenge League B tournament.

References

External links
 

1998 births
Living people
Ugandan cricketers
Uganda Twenty20 International cricketers
Place of birth missing (living people)
Pakistani emigrants to Uganda
Naturalized citizens of Uganda
People from Gilgit
Pakistani Ismailis
Ugandan Ismailis